Events from the year 1949 in France.

Incumbents
President: Vincent Auriol 
President of the Council of Ministers: Henri Queuille (until 28 October), Georges Bidault (starting 28 October)

Events
19–25 August – 1949 Landes forest fire: a wildfire burns 50.000 ha of forest land and kills 82.
27 October – Air France Flight 009 flying from Paris Orly Airport to New York crashes on São Miguel Island in the Azores and kills all 48 on board, including violinist Ginette Neveu and boxer Marcel Cerdan.
Simone de Beauvoir publishes her book The Second Sex (Le Deuxième Sexe), an extremely influential work for second-wave feminism, in Paris.

Sports
30 June – Tour de France begins.
21 July – Tour de France ends, won by Fausto Coppi of Italy

Births
11 January – Jean-Paul Enthoven, philosopher and publisher
18 January – Philippe Starck, designer
6 February – Olivier Chevallier, motor cycle racer (died 1980)
10 February – Maxime Le Forestier, singer
2 March – Isabelle Mir, Alpine skier
22 March – Fanny Ardant, actress
1 April – Gérard Mestrallet, businessman
16 April – Claude Papi, soccer player (died 1983)
24 April – Véronique Sanson, singer-songwriter
27 April – Didier Daeninckx, author and politician
16 May – Gilles Bertould, athlete
13 June – Thierry Sabine, motor cycle racer (died 1986)
17 June – Serge Vinçon, politician (died 2007)
25 June – Patrick Tambay, racing driver (died 2022)
29 June – Henri Proglio, businessman
2 July – Bernard-Pierre Donnadieu, actor (died 2010)
13 August – Philippe Petit, high-wire artist
22 October – Arsène Wenger, soccer manager
25 October – Alain Escoffier, anti-communist activist, self-immolated (died 1977)
13 November – Gérard Lelièvre, racewalker
Full date unknown – Jean-Claude Irvoas, murder victim (died 2005)

Deaths
28 January – Jean-Pierre Wimille, motor racing driver and resistance member (born 1908)
16 February – Roger François, weightlifter (born 1900)
4 June – Maurice Blondel, philosopher (born 1861)
24 September – Pierre de Bréville, composer (born 1861)
27 October – Marcel Cerdan, boxer (born 1916)
27 October – Ginette Neveu, violinist (born 1919)

See also
 List of French films of 1949

References

1940s in France